Brigadier Geoffrey Ernest Warren Franklyn,  (26 August 1889 – 1967) was a senior British Army officer.

Military career
Born the son of Lieutenant General Sir William Franklyn and Helen Williams, and educated at Rugby School, Franklyn was commissioned into the Royal Artillery on 23 December 1909. His service in the First World War was recognized when he was appointed a companion of the Distinguished Service Order in the 1919 Birthday Honours.

Franklyn was briefly Acting General Officer Commanding 18th Infantry Division in May 1940, based in the United Kingdom, during the Second World War.

References

1889 births
1967 deaths
Royal Field Artillery officers
Companions of the Distinguished Service Order
Recipients of the Military Cross
British Army personnel of World War I
British Army brigadiers of World War II
Graduates of the Royal Military Academy, Woolwich